The tenth series of Warsaw Shore (Stylized as the Warsaw Shore X), a Polish television programme based in Warsaw, Poland was filmed in July 2018, and began airing on 21 October 2018. The series was filmed in Polish seaside town Łeba rather than Warsaw, making this the second series to be filmed here following the fourth series in 2015. Ahead of the series it was announced that former cast member Klaudia Stec would be making a return to the show. It was also confirmed that four new cast members had joined the series, including Filip Ćwiek who had previously appeared on second series of Ex on the Beach Poland as main cast member, Julia Kruzer, Patryk Spiker and Klaudia "Czaja" Czajkowska. This is the first series not to include original cast member Wojtek Gola after he quit the show for personal reasons. The series also featured the brief return of nine former cast members Wiktoria Sypucińska, Jakub Henke, Alan Kwieciński, Ewelina "Młoda" Bańkowska, Aleksandra Smoleń, Wojtek Gola, Bartek Barański, Kamila Widz and Piotr Kluk. Paweł "Trybson" Trybała also returned to the show as the boss. On 13 January 2019 it was announced that Marcin "Brzydal" Maruszak had quit the show and this is his last season.

Cast
 Alan Kwieciński (Episodes 5–12)
 Aleksandra Smoleń (Episodes 7–9)
 Bartek Barański (Episode 11)
 Klaudia "Czaja" Czajkowska (Episodes 10–12)
 Damian Zduńczyk
 Ewelina Kubiak
 Filip Ćwiek
 Jakub Henke (Episodes 2–4)
 Julia Kruzer (Episodes 1–10)
 Kamila Widz (Episodes 11–12)
 Ewelina "Młoda" Bańkowska (Episode 7)
 Klaudia Stec
 Anna "Mała" Aleksandrzak
 Marcin "Brzydal" Maruszak (Episodes 1–11)
 Patryk Spiker
 Piotr Kluk (Episode 12)
 Piotr Polak
 Wiktoria Sypucińska (Episodes 2–5)
 Wojciech Gola (Episodes 9–10)

Duration of cast

Notes 

 Key:  = "Cast member" is featured in this episode.
 Key:  = "Cast member" arrives in the house.
 Key:  = "Cast member" voluntarily leaves the house.
 Key:  = "Cast member" returns to the house.
 Key:  = "Cast member" leaves the series.
 Key:  = "Cast member" returns to the series.
 Key:  = "Cast member" returns and leaves the series in the same episode.
 Key:  = "Cast member" is removed from the series.
 Key:  = "Cast member" is not a cast member in this episode.

Episodes

References 

2018 Polish television seasons
Series 10